The men's team table tennis event was part of the table tennis programme at the 2012 Summer Olympics in London. The event took place from Friday 3 August to Wednesday 8 August 2012 at ExCeL London. The tournament was a single elimination tournament with a third place playoff played between the two losing semi-finalists.

Qualification

Schedule
All times are British Summer Time (UTC+1).

Seeds
Team ranking was based on the individual Ranking List of July 2012, taking into consideration those players qualified from each team.

Bracket
The draw for team events took place on 25 July 2012.

Results

First round

Quarterfinals

Semifinals

Bronze medal match

Gold medal match

References

External links
 Official results book – XXX Olympic Games – London 2012. London Organising Committee of the Olympic Games and Paralympic Games. (2013).
 2012 Olympic Games. International Table Tennis Federation.

Men's team
Men's events at the 2012 Summer Olympics